Jaleswar Assembly constituency is one of the 126 assembly constituencies of Assam Legislative Assembly in the north east state of Assam, India. Jaleswar is also part of Dhubri Lok Sabha constituency.
Mr. Aftabuddin Mollah is the current legislator from Jaleswar constituency.

Members of Legislative Assembly  
Listed below.
 1978: Afzalur Rahman, Janata Party
 1983: Afzalur Rahman, Indian Congress (Socialist) - Sarat Chandra Sinha
 1985: Afzalur Rahman, Independent
 1991: Afzalur Rahman, Indian National Congress
 1996: Afzalur Rahman, Indian National Congress
 2001: Aftabuddin Mollah, Indian National Congress
 2006: Afzalur Rahman, Loko Sanmilon
 2011: Moin Uddin Ahmed, All India United Democratic Front
 2016: Sahab Uddin Ahmed, All India United Democratic Front
 2021: Aftabuddin Mollah, Indian National Congress

Election results

2021 results

2016 results

References

External links 
 

Assembly constituencies of Assam
Goalpara district